Andrew Victor Sutherland is an American mathematician and Principal Research Scientist at the Massachusetts Institute of Technology.  His research focuses on computational aspects of number theory and arithmetic geometry. He is known for his contributions to several projects involving large scale computations, including the Polymath project on bounded gaps between primes, the L-functions and Modular Forms Database, the sums of three cubes project, and the computation and classification of Sato-Tate distributions.

Education and career
Sutherland earned a bachelor's degree in mathematics from MIT in 1990.  Following an entrepreneurial career in the software industry he returned to MIT and completed his doctoral degree in mathematics in 2007 under the supervision of Michael Sipser and Ronald Rivest, winning the George M. Sprowls prize for this thesis.  He joined the MIT mathematics department as a Research Scientist in 2009, and was promoted to Principal Research Scientist in 2011.

He is one of the principal investigators in the Simons Collaboration on Arithmetic Geometry, Number Theory, and Computation, a large multi-university collaboration involving Boston University, Brown, Harvard, MIT, and Dartmouth College, and he currently serves as an Associate Editor of Mathematics of Computation, Editor in Chief of Research in Number Theory, Managing Editor of the L-functions and Modular Forms Database, and President of the Number Theory Foundation.

Contributions

Sutherland has developed or improved several methods for counting points on elliptic curves and hyperelliptic curves, that have applications to elliptic curve cryptography, hyperelliptic curve cryptography, elliptic curve primality proving, and the computation of L-functions.  These include improvements to the Schoof–Elkies–Atkin algorithm that led to new point-counting records, and average polynomial-time algorithms for computing zeta functions of hyperelliptic curves over finite fields, developed jointly with David Harvey.

Much of Sutherland's research involves the application of fast point-counting algorithms to numerically investigate generalizations of the Sato-Tate conjecture regarding the distribution of point counts for a curve (or abelian variety) defined over the rational numbers (or a number field) when reduced modulo prime numbers of increasing size..  It is conjectured that these distributions can be described by random matrix models using a "Sato-Tate group" associated to the curve by a construction of Serre.  In 2012 Francesc Fite, Kiran Kedlaya, Victor Rotger and Sutherland classified the Sato-Tate groups that arise for genus 2 curves and abelian varieties of dimension 2, and in 2019 Fite, Kedlaya, and Sutherland announced a similar classification to abelian varieties of dimension 3.

In the process of studying these classifications, Sutherland compiled several large data sets of curves and then worked with Andrew Booker and others to compute their L-functions and incorporate them into the L-functions and Modular Forms Database.  More recently, Booker and Sutherland resolved Mordell's question regarding the representation of 3 as a sum of three cubes.

Recognition
Sutherland was named to the 2021 class of fellows of the American Mathematical Society "for contributions to number theory, both on the theoretical and computational aspects of the subject".  He was selected to deliver the Arf Lecture in 2022.

Selected publications

References

External links
Andrew Sutherland's profile at MIT
Andrew Sutherland's profile on MathSciNet
Andrew Sutherland's profile on zbMath
Andrew Sutherland's profile on Google Scholar
Andrew Sutherland's preprints on arXiv

Year of birth missing (living people)
Living people
21st-century American mathematicians
Number theorists
Massachusetts Institute of Technology School of Science alumni
Massachusetts Institute of Technology School of Science faculty
Fellows of the American Mathematical Society